The Canton of Bolbec is a canton situated in the Seine-Maritime département and in the Normandy region of northern France.

Geography 
An area of farming, quarrying and light industry in the arrondissement of Le Havre, centred on the town of Bolbec. The altitude varies from 12m (Gruchet-le-Valasse) to 154m (Beuzevillette) for an average altitude of 118m.

Composition 
At the French canton reorganisation which came into effect in March 2015, the canton was expanded from 16 to 20 communes:

Bernières
Beuzeville-la-Grenier
Beuzevillette
Bolbec
Gruchet-le-Valasse
Lanquetot
Lillebonne
Mélamare
Mirville
Nointot
Parc-d'Anxtot
Raffetot
Rouville
Saint-Antoine-la-Forêt
Saint-Eustache-la-Forêt
Saint-Jean-de-Folleville
Saint-Jean-de-la-Neuville 
Saint-Nicolas-de-la-Taille
Tancarville
La Trinité-du-Mont

Population

See also 
 Arrondissements of the Seine-Maritime department
 Cantons of the Seine-Maritime department
 Communes of the Seine-Maritime department

References

Bolbec